Hotel Gate One is a hotel in Bratislava, Slovakia, situated near the Bratislava airport in city district Ružinov and Avion Shopping Park, the largest shopping mall in Slovakia.

Operation 
Hotel Gate One Bratislava is classified as hotel ****. In the hotel, there are 114 rooms and 7 suites, congress hall for 500 persons, restaurant and bar on the ground floor and wellness centre on the 7th floor. Concept and location of hotel indicate the primary focus on business customers.

Since its opening in 2009, hotel is operated by the company Eurohotel a.s. and as first hotel in Slovakia is member of international hotel alliance – the Preferred Hotel Group.

Architecture and construction 
Comparing to the initial plan, the hotel rooms have been extended by originally planned balconies and gave rise to more spacious guestrooms. The concept of terrace was kept only on the top floor. The "ribbon" on the façade matches with the architectonic realisation of the hotel building.

The hotel lobby has the largest crystal chandelier in Europe, which is made of 140 thousand small crystals. The restaurant is decorated with part of the trunk of one of the oldest trees in world.

In 2010, hotel was nominated for the CE.ZA.AR architectural price in category Interiors.

External links
 Hotel Gate One Bratislava

References

Tourism in Slovakia
Hotels in Slovakia
Buildings and structures in Bratislava
Companies based in Bratislava
Hotels established in 2009
Hotel buildings completed in 2009